Woodlawn, also known as Woodlawn Plantation, is a historic home and farm complex located near Vernon Hill, Pittsylvania County, Virginia. It was built about 1815, and is a relatively small but unusual, two-part manor house. It consists of two -story main blocks  connected by a hyphen, that are nearly identical in size, shape, and materials.  The house is of heavy timber-frame construction sheathed in weatherboard. The interior features Federal style decorative details. Also on the property the contributing early-19th century log smokehouse, and a family cemetery.

It was listed on the National Register of Historic Places in 2005. The house was demolished in 2015.

This is one of five historic houses in Virginia that are named "Woodland". Others can be found listed under Woodlawn, Virginia.

References

Houses on the National Register of Historic Places in Virginia
Federal architecture in Virginia
Houses completed in 1815
Houses in Pittsylvania County, Virginia
National Register of Historic Places in Pittsylvania County, Virginia